Below is a list of sweets and desserts found in Brazilian cuisine. Brazilian cuisine has European, African and Amerindian influences.  It varies greatly by region, reflecting the country's mix of native and immigrant populations, and its continental size as well. This has created a national cuisine marked by the preservation of regional differences.

Desserts and sweets

A–E 

 Açaí na tigela – a Brazilian dish made of frozen and mashed açaí palm fruit, it is served as a smoothie in a bowl or glass. 
 Amanteigado – a buttery cookie or biscuit
 
 
 
 Beijinho – a common Brazilian birthday party candy
 Beijo de mulata
 Bijajica – a cookie
 Biriba or biribinha
 Biroró
 Bolo de rolo – a cake prepared using guava, it is recognized as a national dish by Brazilian law.
  – a typical Pernambuco cake
  – a coconut torte that is commonly served during Brazil's Independence Day
 Brigadeiro – a traditional Brazilian confectionery
 Broinha de coco – a coconut-based biscuit-like dessert
 
 Cacuanga
 Cajuzinho – a popular sweet made of peanuts, cashew nuts and sugar and is shaped like a tiny cashew
 
 Canjica – a popular Festa Junina sweet dish prepared using canjica corn
  – An éclair-like dessert
  – a typical Pernambuco dessert
 
 
 Cocada – a traditional coconut candy or confectionery found in many parts of Latin America
 Cocada branca
 Cocada morena
 Cocada preta
 Creme de papaya – a frozen dessert
  – a chocolate-like dessert made using cupuaçu instead of cacao
 Curau – a sweet custard-like dessert made from the pressed juice of unripe maize, cooked with milk and sugar
 Doces Cristalizados
 
  – typical dessert of the Northeast Region of Brazil
 Espuma de sapo

F–J 
 Fatia de braga
 Fios de ovos – a traditional Portuguese sweet food made of eggs (chiefly yolks), drawn into thin strands and boiled in sugar syrup. They are a traditional element in Portuguese and Brazilian cuisine, both in desserts and as side dishes

K–O 

 Mané-pança
 Manjar blanco – a term used in Spanish-speaking area of the world in reference to a variety of milk-based delicacies. 
 Manjar branco – a pure white Brazilian coconut pudding 
 Maria-mole – similar to a marshmallow, its base ingredients are sugar, gelatin and egg whites, and it is usually covered in grated coconut
 Nhá Benta or "teta de nega", a chocolate-coated creamy marshmallow
 Mugunzá – a porridge made with white de-germed whole maize kernels, cooked with milk, sugar and cinnamon until tender. Other ingredients are also sometimes used.
 Olho-de-sogra – ("mother-in-law's eye" in Portuguese) is a Brazilian candy

P–T 

 Paçoca – a candy made out of ground peanuts, sugar and salt
  – A Brazilian variant of the chocolate salami, consists of crushed biscuits (usually similar to Marie biscuits) mixed in brigadeiro
 Pão de mel - A little cake made of honey, filled with condensed milk cream and covered with a thin layer of chocolate 
 Papo-de-anjo – a traditional Portuguese dessert made chiefly from whipped egg yolks, baked and then boiled in sugar syrup.
 Pastel
 Pastel de Santa Clara
 Passion fruit mousse
 Pavê – a dessert similar to Tiramisu made using ladyfingers (known as "champagne biscuits" in Brazil) or a Marie biscuit equivalent, chocolate cream and condensed milk
 Pé-de-moleque – a candy made using peanuts, jaggery or molasses
 Pudim de leite moça [pt]
 Queijadinha – a candy that originated in Portugal, and is common in Brazil
 Quindim – a popular Brazilian baked custard dessert
 Rapadura – unrefined whole cane sugar
 Sweet rice – rice pudding
 Sagu – a southern Brazilian dessert, made with tapioca pearls, sugar and red wine, it is typical of the state of Rio Grande do Sul.
 Torta alemã

U–Z 
  – A drink made from cooked umbu fruit, milk and sugar

Gallery

See also

 List of Brazilian dishes
 List of desserts

References

External links
 Brazilian Desserts. Food & Wine.

Sweets

Brazilian